Bill Owens (born September 25, 1938) is an American photographer, photojournalist, brewer and editor living in Hayward, California. He is best known for his photographs of suburban domestic scenes taken in the East Bay and published in the book Suburbia (1973). Owens is the recipient of a Guggenheim Fellowship and two National Endowment for the Arts Grants.

According to The New York Sun, "Owens is uniquely associated with suburbanites living in the tract housing developments that absorbed 60 million Americans in the decades following World War II."

Biography
Owens was born in San Jose, California and raised on a farm in Citrus Heights. He studied visual anthropology at San Francisco State College, dropped out and went on an around-the-world hitchhiking trip before finishing his education at Chico State College. He served in the Peace Corps in Jamaica and, upon returning to the USA, lived and worked in the town of Livermore in the San Francisco Bay Area, as a staff photographer for a local newspaper.

In 1973, Owens released the book Suburbia, whose pictures showed American suburban life in Livermore.  The Los Angeles Times commented that the book "rouses pity, contempt, laughter and self-recognition. Owens’s influence was immense during the 1970s especially in respect to the kind of portraiture that shows the middle class." In 2001, Suburbia was included in Andrew Roth’s The Book of 101 Books: Seminal Photographic Books of the Twentieth Century.

He has published other photography books, and his photographs have been exhibited internationally and are in the collections of the Museum of Modern Art, Berkeley Art Museum, Los Angeles County Museum of Art, San Francisco Museum of Modern Art, Los Angeles Museum of Contemporary Art, San Jose Museum of Art and the Getty Museum in Los Angeles.

Owens went on to become a well-known beer brewer and publisher of American Brewer magazine. He founded Buffalo Bill's Brewery in Hayward in 1983, one of the first brewpubs to open in California since prohibition. In 2003, he founded the American Distilling Institute, a professional membership organization and publishing house "to promote and defend the art and enterprise of craft distilling." As the president of ADI, Owens has become one of the leading spokesmen of the craft distilling movement.

Bibliography
Suburbia. San Francisco: Straight Arrow, 1973. Revised 1999, .
Our Kind of People: American Groups and Rituals. 1975. .
Working: I Do It For the Money. 1977. .
How to Build a Small Brewery: Draft Beer in Ten Days. 1982. .
Leisure. 2005. .
Bill Owens. Anthology. 2008. By Claudia Zanfi, with a novel by A. M. Homes (Damiani), and photographs and afterword by Owens.
The Village: Bill Owens – Jamaica Peace Corps Photographs 1964–66. True North, 2014. Edited by Geir Jordahl, Kate Jordahl, and John Thacker. With an Introduction by Victoria Sheridan and an afterword by Geir Jordahl. .

Awards
1976: Guggenheim Fellowship, John Simon Guggenheim Memorial Foundation
Two National Endowment for the Arts Grants.

Exhibitions
San Jose Museum of Art, San Jose, CA. A retrospective

References

General references
The Washington Post: "The American Dream, Circa 1970: Suburbia Photographs Capture How Much We've Changed", by Frank Ahrens, March 24, 2000
The New York Times: "A Vision of Suburban Bliss Edged With Irony" by Jeffrey Kastner, March 19, 2000
Seattle Post-Intelligencer: "Bill Owens' Unrelenting Eye Defines a Generation", April 9, 1999

External links 

American brewers
American photojournalists
Journalists from California
Artists from San Jose, California
People from Hayward, California
People from Livermore, California
Living people
1938 births